The Old Dominion Monarchs women’s basketball team (formerly the Lady Monarchs) represents Old Dominion University in Norfolk, Virginia. The team currently competes in the NCAA Division I as a member of the Sun Belt Conference.

The ODU Monarchs women's basketball team contributed to the initial rise in popularity of women's intercollegiate basketball in the United States in the 1970s. Women's college basketball was organized under the auspices of the AIAW in the early 1970s, at a time when competitive power was distributed among small colleges that had established a niche (such as Immaculata, Delta State, West Chester State, Wayland Baptist and Stephen F. Austin).

ODU won two AIAW national championships in 1979 and 1980 in dominating fashion with star players, Nancy Lieberman and Anne Donovan. Led by Medina Dixon and Tracy Claxton, ODU won the NCAA Division 1 championship in 1985, defeating the University of Georgia 70–65.

ODU along with UCLA and Tennessee, among others, led the rise to prominence of large schools with national reputations to the top intercollegiate level, before the NCAA began sponsoring sports for women.

Rivalries

Postseason results

NCAA Division I

AIAW Division I
The Lady Monarchs made three appearances in the AIAW National Division I basketball tournament, with a combined record of 11–1.

Home venues
Old Dominion play their home venues at Chartway Arena. In the past, the team played at Old Dominion University Fieldhouse during 1970–1977, and 1990–2002.

Notable players

 Lucienne Berthieu
 Medina Dixon
 Anne Donovan (November 1, 1961 – June 13, 2018),coach and player at 6'8"
 Adrienne Goodson
 T. J. Jordan
 Nancy Lieberman (born 1958), WNBA Hall of Fame basketball player, general manager, and coach, Olympic silver medal
 Clarisse Machanguana
 Hamchétou Maïga
 Inge Nissen
 Ticha Penicheiro
 Nyree Roberts
 Rhonda Rompola
 Kim Aston
 Jackie Kenney
 TJ Jones
 Kelly Lyons
 Celeste Hill

Coaches
Mary Jackson (1969–1973) 
Debbie Wilson (1973–1974)
Pam Parsons (1974–1977)
Marianne Stanley (1977–1987)
Wendy Larry (1987–2011) 
Karen Barefoot (2011–2017)
Nikki McCray (2017–2020)
DeLisha Milton-Jones (2020-)

See also
 NCAA Women's Division I Basketball Championship
 1985 NCAA Division I women's basketball tournament
 AIAW women's basketball tournament
 Colonial Athletic Association women's basketball tournament
 Sun Belt women's basketball tournament
 Women's Basketball at ODU, Special Collections and University Archives Wiki, Old Dominion University Libraries

References

External links